Fuel to the Flames is the seventh album by the German hard rock band Bonfire. Released in 1999 by BMG International, it marks the return of the signature rock sound that the band had been known for.

Track listing

Bonus tracks
 Proud of My Country (Acoustic) (4:52)
 Goodnight Amanda (Extended) (6:30)

Band members
Claus Lessmann - lead & backing vocals, acoustic guitar
Hans Ziller - lead, rhythm & acoustic guitars, backing vocals, talk box
Chris Lausmann - lead & rhythm guitar, keyboards, backing vocals
Uwe Köhler - bass, backing vocals
Jürgen Wiehler - drums, backing vocals

Reception
Metal Reviews said, "Fuel to the Flames is an excellent way to begin your journey into one of rocks most overlooked bands. This is a good representation of the band the way they are today while still containing elements of their glorious past."

References

External links
 Billboard's Listing of Fuel to the Flames album

Bonfire (band) albums
1999 albums